Bruna Jessica Oliveira Farias (born 19 May 1992) is a Brazilian sprinter. She competed in the 4 × 100 metres relay at the 2015 World Championships in Athletics in Beijing but did not make the final. She competed at the 2020 Summer Olympics.

Competition record

1Did not finish in the final

Personal bests
Outdoors
100 metres – 11.38 (+0.7 m/s, São Paulo 2021)
100 metres – 11.29 (+4.6 m/s, São Paulo 2021)
200 metres – 23.32 (+1.1 m/s, Sao Bernardo do Campo 2016)

Indoors
60 metres – 7.42 (Sao Caetano do Sul 2014)

References

External links

1992 births
Living people
Brazilian female sprinters
World Athletics Championships athletes for Brazil
Pan American Games athletes for Brazil
Athletes (track and field) at the 2015 Pan American Games
Athletes (track and field) at the 2016 Summer Olympics
Athletes (track and field) at the 2020 Summer Olympics
Olympic athletes of Brazil
Troféu Brasil de Atletismo winners
Olympic female sprinters
People from Maceió
Sportspeople from Alagoas
21st-century Brazilian women